Malinta National High School is a school established in 1997 in Valenzuela City.

Educational institutions established in 1997
High schools in Metro Manila
Schools in Valenzuela, Metro Manila
Public schools in Metro Manila
1997 establishments in the Philippines